Shimia haliotis is a Gram-negative, rod-shaped and motile bacterium from the genus of Shimia which has been isolated from the intestinal tract of an abalone (Haliotis discus hannai) from the Jeju Island in Korea.

References 

Rhodobacteraceae
Bacteria described in 2013